Shredder is a commercial chess engine and graphical user interface (GUI) developed in Germany by Stefan Meyer-Kahlen in 1993. Shredder won the World Microcomputer Chess Championship in 1996 and 2000, the World Computer Chess Championship in 1999 and 2003, the World Computer Speed Chess Championship in 2002, 2003, 2004, 2005, and 2007, and the World Chess Software Championship in 2010.

The Shredder engine version 10.0 was released in June 2006. Version 11.0 was released in October 2007. Version 12 was released in January 2010. The "Deep" version takes advantage of multiple CPUs or multiple core CPUs. Version 13 was released on 30 October 2016. Version 13 is about 300 Elo better than Version 12.

Shredder is one of the few commercial chess programs which is available not only for Windows and Mac OS, but also for Linux. Shredder is also available on the iPhone, the iPad and Android. GNOME Chess is used as the graphical front-end for Shredder.

Competition results
Shredder has participated in a number of computer chess tournaments since its inception. The following events are the tournaments in which Shredder has won.

See also
Computer chess
Fischer random chess
Universal Chess Interface
World Computer Chess Championship
Top Chess Engine Championship

References

External links

Chess engines
1993 software
Video game companies of Germany